Salim Yahya al-Kharega is a Yemeni diplomat. He quit his position as Ambassador to Spain over the 2011 Yemeni uprising but was denied by the government.

References

Yemeni diplomats
Ambassadors of Yemen to Spain
Living people
Year of birth missing (living people)
Place of birth missing (living people)
21st-century Yemeni politicians